Ab Chendar (also Romanized as Āb Chendār; also known as Ābchendār) is a village in Lalar and Katak Rural District, Chelo District, Andika County, Khuzestan Province, Iran. At the 2006 census, its population was 143, in 27 families.

References 

Populated places in Andika County